Glenrowan is a name associated with a place in the Australian state of Victoria. it may refer to:
 Glenrowan, Victoria, a small town on the Hume Highway
 Glenrowan wine region
 Glenrowan railway station
 The Glenrowan Affair, a 1951 movie about Ned Kelly